Goronwy Foel (fl. about the middle of the 13th century) was a Welsh language court poet from Deheubarth, south-west Wales.

References
Golygir Mawl Marared ferch Rhys Fychan gan R. Geraint Gruffydd yn, N.G. Costigan ac eraill (gol.), Gwaith Dafydd Benfras ac Eraill (Caerdydd, 1995), yn Nhgyfres Beirdd y Tywysogion.

Welsh-language poets
13th-century deaths
13th-century Welsh poets
Year of birth unknown